Tommy Mawat anak Bada (born 26 June 1995) is a Malaysian footballer, currently playing for Negeri Sembilan in the Malaysia Super League as left wing-back. He also can operate as a midfielder and winger .

Club Career
A Sarawak FA youth player, he played for the senior team for two seasons, before joining PJ Rangers in November 2017 for the 2018 season, together with 2 other players from Sarawak FA.

He was officially announced as a new Negeri Sembilan FC player on January 12, 2023.

International Career
He has been called to Malaysia national under-23 football team, and were included in the 23-men squad for the 2018 Asian Games by head coach Ong Kim Swee.

References
 4.  Tommy mawat sertai Kuching FA

External links
 

1995 births
Living people
Malaysian footballers
Sarawak FA players
Sarawak United FC players
Sabah F.C. (Malaysia) players
Negeri Sembilan FC players
Malaysia Super League players
Malaysia Premier League players
Association football forwards
Association football wingers
Footballers at the 2018 Asian Games
Asian Games competitors for Malaysia